The 1979 NCAA men's volleyball tournament was the 10th annual tournament to determine the national champion of NCAA men's college volleyball. The tournament was played at Pauley Pavilion in Los Angeles, California during May 1979.

UCLA defeated USC in the final match,  3–1 (12–15, 15–12, 15–11, 15–7), to win their seventh national title. Coached by Al Scates, the Bruins finished the season undefeated (30–0).

UCLA's Sinjin Smith was named Most Outstanding Player of the tournament. An All-tournament team of seven players was also named.

Qualification
Until the creation of the NCAA Men's Division III Volleyball Championship in 2012, there was only a single national championship for men's volleyball. As such, all NCAA men's volleyball programs (whether from Division I, Division II, or Division III) were eligible. A total of 4 teams were invited to contest this championship.

Tournament bracket 
Site: Pauley Pavilion, Los Angeles, California

All tournament team 
Sinjin Smith, UCLA (Most outstanding player)
Steve Salmons, UCLA
Peter Ehrman, UCLA
Joe Mica, UCLA
Bob Yoder, USC
Pat Powers, USC
Tim Hovland, USC

See also 
 NCAA Men's National Collegiate Volleyball Championship

References

1979
NCAA Men's Volleyball Championship
NCAA Men's Volleyball Championship
1979 in sports in California
May 1979 sports events in the United States
Volleyball in California